Once Upon a Time in Iraq is a 2020 British documentary television miniseries, directed by James Bluemel and narrated by  British-Iraqi Andy Serkis. Composed of five episodes, it features interviews with Iraqi citizens, as well as American military personnel and international journalists about the Iraqi conflict and its effects on the Iraqi people.

Overview 

The series chronologically covers the 2003 invasion of Iraq by a United States-led coalition that overthrew the government of Saddam Hussein, and its subsequent occupation of Iraq (2003–2011); the first phase of the Iraqi insurgency (2003–2006); the Iraqi Civil War (2006–2008); the post-US withdrawal insurgency (2011–2013); and the War in Iraq (2013–2017), an armed conflict between the Iraqi Army and its allies against the Islamic State.

The first episode was broadcast in the United Kingdom on BBC Two on 13 July 2020. A heavily edited, single-episode, feature-length version was subsequently broadcast in the United States by PBS as part of their Frontline series on 14 July 2020. The American version omitted the interviews with Rudy Reyes and Nathan Sassaman among others.
The American version also completely omits the third episode on the Battle of Fallujah. 

The series was widely acclaimed in the British press, winning the awards for best documentary and outstanding series at the Rose d'Or festival in December 2020, in addition to being named Best Factual Series at the 2021 British Academy Television Awards.

Interviewees 

 Mustafa Abed
 Nidhal Abed
 Alaa Adel
 Ahmed Albasheer
 Ahmad al-Matyouti
 Ibrahim al-Rawi
 Christian Dominguez
 Dexter Filkins
 Ashley Gilbertson
 Um Ibrahim
 Ali Hussein Kadhim
 Sally Mars
 Lewis Miller
 Susie Miller
 Omar Mohammed
 Waleed Nesyif
 John Nixon (CIA)
 Rudy Reyes
 Aliyah Khalaf Saleh
 Tahany Saleh
 Nathan Sassaman
 Sam Williams

Note: Several of the above were omitted from the version made for American television.

Episodes

Reception 
Once Upon a Time in Iraq received critical acclaim following its release. The Guardian called it "a gripping, harrowing masterpiece" and praised its content, noting the use of interviews with people who were there, as opposed to prioritising interviews with politicians and analysts. New Statesman similarly gave it a rave review, calling it a "duty" to watch and praising Bluemel's storytelling.

References

External links 
 
 The official BBC site webpage

2020 British television series debuts
2020 British television series endings
2020s British documentary television series
Documentary television series about war
BBC television documentaries about history during the 21st Century
English-language television shows